The mixed doubles soft tennis event was part of the soft tennis programme and took place on October 7, at the Sajik Tennis Courts.

Schedule
All times are Korea Standard Time (UTC+09:00)

Results

Preliminary round

Group A

Group B

Group C

Group D

Final round

References 

2002 Asian Games Official Reports, Page 700–701
Official website

External links 
Results

Soft tennis at the 2002 Asian Games